People Time: The Complete Recordings is a set of seven CDs of music by saxophonist Stan Getz and pianist Kenny Barron which was recorded in March 1991 at Jazzhus Montmartre in Copenhagen, Denmark. It was released in 2009 (2010 in US).

When this album was recorded, Getz was suffering greatly from the liver cancer that would end his life three months after its completion. There were times that he had to take a break to allow the pain to subside, and he was urged to call a halt. However, he insisted on completing both the engagement at Jazzhus Montmartre and the recording. On the fourth and final night, though, they only played one set. It was announced by the stage manager that Getz was feeling too weak to continue after the break.

Reception
The AllMusic review of the original two-disc set by Scott Yanow said "none of the 14 performances are less than great. A brilliant farewell recording by a masterful jazzman". AllMusic awarded the album 4 stars, but scores of AllMusic users have given it a cumulative rating of five stars.

Track listing

Disc 1 (March 3, 1991) – First set 
 Stan Getz Announcement – 0:47
 "I'm Okay" (Eddie del Barrio) – 6:32
 "Gone with the Wind" (Allie Wrubel – Herb Magidson) – 6:33
 "First Song" (Charlie Haden) – 11:49
 "Allison's Waltz" (Alan Broadbent) – 8:38
 "Stablemates" (Benny Golson) – 8:38

Disc 2 (March 3, 1991) – Second set 
 "Autumn Leaves" (Joseph Kosma – Jacques Prévert – Johnny Mercer) – 10:27
 "Yours and Mine" (Thad Jones) – 13:45
 "(There is No) Greater Love" (Isham Jones – Marty Symes) – 8:56
 "People Time" (Benny Carter) – 8:49
 "The Surrey with the Fringe on Top" (Richard Rodgers – Oscar Hammerstein II) – 8:02
 "Soul Eyes" (Mal Waldron) – 5:45

Disc 3 (March 4, 1991) – First set 
 Tuning – 0:42
 "You Don't Know What Love Is" (Don Raye – Gene DePaul) – 9:51
 "You Stepped Out of a Dream" (Nacio Herb Brown – Gus Kahn) – 9:27
 "Soul Eyes" (Mal Waldron) – 7:47
 "I Wish You Love (Que reste-t-il de nos amours)"  (Charles Trenet) (English version Albert A. Beach) – 8:35
 "I'm Okay" (Eddie del Barrio) – 5:36
 "Night and Day" (Cole Porter) – 8:51

Disc 4 (March 4, 1991) – Second set 
 "East of the Sun (and West of the Moon)" (Brooks Bowman) – 9:35
 "Con Alma" (Dizzy Gillespie) – 10:33
 "People Time" (Benny Carter) – 6:34
 "Stablemates" (Benny Golson) – 10:12
 "I Remember Clifford" (Benny Golson) – 6:07
 "Like Someone in Love" (Jimmy van Heusen – Johnny Burke) – 8:40
 "First Song" (Charlie Haden) – 8:44
 "The Surrey with the Fringe on Top" (Richard Rodgers – Oscar Hammerstein II) – 7:53
 "Yours and Mine" (Thad Jones) – 9:21

Disc 5 (March 5, 1991) – First set 
 "The End of a Love Affair" (Edward C. Redding) – 9:25
 "Whisper Not" (Benny Golson) – 8:52
 "You Stepped Out of a Dream" (Nacio Herb Brown – Gus Kahn) – 8:47
 "I Remember Clifford" (Benny Golson) – 9:39
 "I Wish You Love (Que reste-t-il de nos amours)"  (Charles Trenet) (English version Albert A. Beach) – 7:51
 "Bouncing with Bud" (Bud Powell) – 7:12
 "Soul Eyes" (Mal Waldron) – 7:30
 "The Surrey with the Fringe on Top" (Richard Rodgers – Oscar Hammerstein II) – 9:49

Disc 6 (March 5, 1991) – Second set 
 "East of the Sun (and West of the Moon)" (Brooks Bowman) – 9:55
 "Night and Day" (Cole Porter) – 9:25
 "First Song" (Charlie Haden) – 10:10
 "Like Someone in Love" (Jimmy van Heusen – Johnny Burke) – 8:08
 "Stablemates" (Benny Golson) – 9:33
 "People Time" (Benny Carter) – 6:51

Disc 7 (March 6, 1991) 
 Stan Getz Announcement – 0:56
 "Softly, as in a Morning Sunrise" (Sigmund Romberg – Oscar Hammerstein II) – 8:24
 "I Wish You Love (Que reste-t-il de nos amours)"  (Charles Trenet) (English version Albert A. Beach) – 8:49
 "Hush-A-Bye" (Ambroise Thomas – Sammy Fain – Jerry Seelen) – 10:00
 "I'm Okay" (Eddie del Barrio) – 5:54
 "Con Alma" (Dizzy Gillespie) – 7:59
 "Gone with the Wind" (Allie Wrubel – Herb Magidson) – 7:30
 "The Surrey with the Fringe on Top" (Richard Rodgers – Oscar Hammerstein II) – 7:55
 Bonus Track (Engineer Soundcheck): "Night and Day" (Cole Porter) – 8:55

Personnel

Performance 
 Stan Getz – tenor saxophone
 Kenny Barron – piano

Production 
 Jean-Philippe Allard – producer
 Johnnie Hjerting – recording and mixing engineer
 Jay Newland – mastering and editing
 Gorm Valentin – liner photography
 Patrice Beauséjour – art direction and cover art
 Farida Bachir – box set production manager

References

Further reading
Churchill, Nicholas (2004). Stan Getz: An Annotated Bibliography and Filmography, pp. 138–144. McFarland

External links 
Official Stan Getz homepage
 Official Kenny Barron homepage

2010 albums
Stan Getz albums
Kenny Barron albums
Sunnyside Records albums